Danielle Simonnet (born 2 July 1971) is a French politician from La France Insoumise. She was elected Member of Parliament for Paris's 15th constituency in the 2022 legislative election.

Political career 
In March 2022, she proposed a motion for the Council of Paris to buy the La Clef cinema and allow the collective to continue operations, however the motion was rejected by the city executives.

References

See also 

 List of deputies of the 16th National Assembly of France

1971 births
Living people
French psychologists
Paris Nanterre University alumni
21st-century French politicians
21st-century French women politicians
Members of Parliament for Paris
Deputies of the 16th National Assembly of the French Fifth Republic
Women members of the National Assembly (France)
Councillors of Paris
Left Party (France) politicians
Socialist Party (France) politicians
People from Seine-et-Marne
La France Insoumise politicians